Albany M. Robichaud (22 July 1903 – 27 October 1974) was a Canadian lawyer and politician. Robichaud was a Progressive Conservative party member of the House of Commons of Canada. He was born in Shippagan, New Brunswick and became a barrister by career.

He attended University of St. Joseph's College where he graduated with a Bachelor of Arts degree in 1923, then in 1926 attained a Master of Arts. He proceeded to the University of New Brunswick for law studies where in 1927 he received a Bachelor of Civil Law degree then called to the bar that year. He then established a law practice in Bathurst, New Brunswick and in 1943 received a Doctor of Civil Law degree from Bathurst's Université du Sacré-Coeur. From 1945 to 1948, he was mayor of Bathurst.

Robichaud ran unsuccessful campaigns for a House of Commons seat at the Gloucester riding in several federal elections. In 1930 and 1935 and 1940, he was a Conservative candidate (with the Conservatives known as the "National Government" party in 1940). He ran as an independent at Gloucester in 1945.

Robichaud was elected to Parliament for the Progressive Conservative party in a by-election on 26 May 1952. He was defeated in the 1953 federal election by Hédard Robichaud of the Liberal party.

After leaving federal office, Albany Robichaud became the fifth Acadian to be appointed a judge for the Court of Queen's Bench of New Brunswick, the province's superior court.

He bought and lived in the Flavien Doucet Residence, a historic site in Bathurst distrcit.

Electoral record

References

External links
 

1903 births
1974 deaths
Acadian people
People from Gloucester County, New Brunswick
Mayors of Bathurst, New Brunswick
Members of the House of Commons of Canada from New Brunswick
Judges in New Brunswick
Lawyers in New Brunswick
Progressive Conservative Party of Canada MPs
20th-century Canadian lawyers